Sainte-Colombe is a commune in the Doubs department in the Bourgogne-Franche-Comté region in eastern France.

Geography

Population

Transportation
The commune has a railway station, on the Frasne–Les Verrières line.

See also
 Communes of the Doubs department

References

External links

 Sainte-Colombe on the regional Web site 

Communes of Doubs